Walter Desmaison (born 18 October 1991 in Girac, France) is a French professional rugby union player. He plays at prop for Racing Métro in the Top 14.

References

External links
Ligue Nationale De Rugby Profile
European Professional Club Rugby Profile
Racing Métro Profile

Living people
1991 births
French rugby union players
Rugby union props